The Southeast Asian Beach Handball Championship is an international beach handball competition contested by national teams from Southeast Asia.

History
The first edition of the championships which featured two separate competitions for men's and women's national teams was held in Dumaguete, Philippines at the Rizal Boulevard. The championships held from November 3 to 6, 2017, were organized on a short notice with Thailand and Vietnam invited to participate. Vietnam won both the inaugural men's and women's championship.

Results
Men

Women

Medal table

References

Beach handball competitions